Uyemsky is a rural locality (a settlement) in Primorsky District, Arkhangelsk Oblast, Russia. The population was 3,742 as of 2010. There are 6 streets.

Geography 
Uyemsky is located on the Severnaya Dvina River, 20 km southeast of Arkhangelsk (the district's administrative centre) by road. Silikatny and Malye Karely are the nearest rural localities.

References 

Rural localities in Primorsky District, Arkhangelsk Oblast